Yuexiu Road Subdistrict is a subdistrict situated on the northern side of Hexi District, Tianjin, China. It shares border with Taoyuan Subdistrict to its north, Guajiasi and Jianshan Subdistricts to its east, Youyi Road Subdistrict to its south, and Machang Subdistrict to its west. In the year 2010, it had 76,409 inhabitants under its administration.

The name Yuexiu can be translated as "Exceed Elegance".

History

Administrative divisions 
At the end of 2021, Yuexiu Road Subdistrict was composed of the following 10 communities:

Gallery

References 

Township-level divisions of Tianjin
Hexi District, Tianjin